George Duncan Will (16 April 1937 – 4 December 2010) was a Scottish professional golfer.	

A consistent tournament player around the world with a fine swing, George Will played in the 1963, 1965 and 1967 Ryder Cup's. He was one of the select number of golfers chosen to play in the televised Shell's Wonderful World of Golf series, defeating reigning USPGA champion Dave Marr at Turnberry in 1966.

After his playing days, he became a teacher which included a spell as Belgian National Coach in the early 1990s. He is the author of Golf The Modern Way (1968)

Amateur wins
1955 Scottish Boys' Championship
1957 British Youths Open Championship, Gleneagles-Saxone Foursomes Tournament (with Eric Brown)

Professional wins
1958 Northern Open
1963 Gor-Ray Cup, Northern Open
1964 Smart Weston Tournament
1965 Esso Golden Tournament
1967 Basildon Tournament
1970 Skol Tournament
1979 Sunningdale Foursomes (with Roger Chapman)

Others:
Kent Professional Championship (6): 1972, 1975, 1976 (plus 3 others)
Kent Open (5): 1968, 1969, 1972, 1975, 1985
Army Champion (2): 1959, 1960

Results in major championships

Note: Will only played in the Masters Tournament and The Open Championship.

CUT = missed the half-way cut
"T" indicates a tie for a place

Team appearances
Ryder Cup (representing Great Britain): 1963, 1965, 1967
World Cup (representing Scotland): 1963, 1969, 1970
R.T.V. International Trophy (representing Scotland): 1967
PGA Cup (representing Great Britain and Ireland): 1976 (non-playing captain)

References

External links

Scottish male golfers
European Tour golfers
European Senior Tour golfers
Ryder Cup competitors for Europe
1937 births
2010 deaths